"Spoiled" is a song by English singer-songwriter Joss Stone from her second studio album, Mind Body & Soul (2004). Written by Stone, Lamont Dozier, and Beau Dozier and released in March 2005 as the album's third single, "Spoiled" peaked at number 32 on the UK Singles Chart, becoming the album's lowest-charting single in the UK. It was later included on the 2011 compilation album The Best of Joss Stone 2003–2009.

Music video

The music video for "Spoiled", directed by Joseph Kahn, was filmed on location at the West Taghkanic Diner, a roadside diner located at the junctions of the Taconic Parkway and Route 82 in West Taghkanic, New York, in February 2005. It opens with Stone and her boyfriend (played by model James Guardino) arriving at the diner at night in different cars. After getting out of their cars, the couple starts to have an argument. After a while, they go inside the diner and sit at a table. In an attempt to cheer Stone up, the boyfriend shows her a teddy bear. Stone tries to take it from his hand and he pulls it back, but eventually gives it back to her. Stone takes the teddy bear, leaves the diner and gets in her car. The boyfriend runs after her attempting to stop her, but as it was hopeless, he gets in his car and follows her on the road. After a few seconds driving, they see a light coming towards their direction, and the two subsequently crash into each other's car. Following the crash, Stone and her boyfriend are thrown from their respective cars in slow motion as they float in the air with tiny pieces of glass around them. The scene then goes backwards as if the accident had not happened, and they head for the diner in their cars, exactly like the video's beginning.

Track listings

UK CD single
 "Spoiled" – 4:02
 "Right to Be Wrong" (live in New York City) – 3:23

UK DVD single
 "Spoiled" (video) – 4:00
 "The Chokin' Kind" (live video in New York City) – 4:45
 "Fell in Love with a Boy" (live audio in New York City) – 4:14

European CD single
 "Spoiled" – 4:02
 "The Chokin' Kind" (onstage at Irving Plaza) – 3:42

European maxi-CD single
 "Spoiled" – 4:02
 "Don't Know How" (onstage at Irving Plaza) – 5:15
 "Less Is More" (onstage at Irving Plaza) – 5:03

Personnel

Musicians
 Joss Stone – lead vocals, backing vocals
 David "Jody" Hill – drums
 Angelo Morris – bass
 Willie "Little Beaver" Hale – guitar
 Timmy Thomas – Hammond organ
 Benny Latimore – piano
 Betty Wright – backing vocals

Production
 Michael Mangini – producer, mixing, programming
 Steve Greenberg – producer
 Betty Wright – producer
 Steve Greenwell – engineer, mixing, programming
 Thom Bell – string arrangements, horn arrangements

Charts

Release history

References

2004 songs
2005 singles
Joss Stone songs
Songs written by Beau Dozier
Songs written by Joss Stone
Songs written by Lamont Dozier
Music videos directed by Joseph Kahn
Relentless Records singles
Virgin Records singles